Protect Our Winters (POW) is a 501(c)(3) nonprofit that focuses its efforts on legislation regarding climate change. The nonprofit, created in 2007 by professional snowboarder Jeremy Jones, strives to turn outdoor enthusiasts into climate advocates. According to the group's mission statement, "Protect Our Winters leads a community of athletes, creative-pioneers and business leaders to achieve this mission."  The organization's headquarters are located in Boulder, Colorado, United States.

Policy Agenda
According to the nonprofit's Policy webpage, POW focuses its efforts on legislation regarding carbon pricing, solar, public lands, and transportation.

Carbon Pricing

 POW believes in setting an economy-wide price on carbon
 Instead of fighting individual legislative battles for one regulation at a time, POW believes that by putting a price on carbon we can reduce emissions more efficiently.
Solar

 POW believes in transitioning to a clean energy economy by investing in solar energy.
 To realistically reduce our reliance on fossil fuels as a source of power, the group believes in utilizing clean sources of energy.

Transportation

 POW believes in utilizing innovative transit solutions to minimize greenhouse gas emissions.
 POW believes there is a clear need for strong advocacy of innovative solutions to transform the transportation sector.

Public Lands

 POW believes in reducing fossil fuel emission from our public lands.
 The extraction and burning of fossil fuels release carbon dioxide and other greenhouse gasses, including methane. POW believes that by protecting public lands, it will, in turn, protect the climate.

Activism
According to POW's website, they aim to utilize its members, partners and Alliance members in advocating for its cause. POW’s partnerships with brands and CEOs continue to grow. In 2018, POW executed two congressional briefings and three lobby days, including the highest attended annual September Lobby Day (35 attendees meeting with a total of 30 Congressional Offices). They had nine companies represented, including Alterra Mountain Company, Aspen Skiing Company, Bemis Associates, Burton, Mt. Bachelor, POWDR Corporation, Ski Utah, Smartwool, and Spyder.

In December 2012, POW worked in partnership with environmental agency, Natural Resources Defense Council to publish a study determining how climate change is affecting the economy of the winter sport and tourism industry in the United States.

The organization, despite the United States federal government shutdown of 2013, sent a delegation to Washington to meet with senators and discuss the issues surrounding climate change.

On December 3, 2013, POW spoke with the United States Environmental Protection Agency(EPA) Administrator Gina McCarthy on POW's influence on the winter sport community and POW agreed to fully support the EPA and Clean Air Act (United States).

POW partnered with several Yale students to meet with winter athletes during the 2014 Winter Olympics at Sochi to promote a more open discussion about the effects of climate change.

POW also participated at a march at New York City during the UN Climate Summit of 2014.

Members and Support

POW receives financial support from The North Face, Patagonia and CLIF Bar and many other corporate companies, partners, foundations, individuals and resorts.

References

External links
Adler, Ben, and Rebecca Leber (Grist.org), "Donald Trump once urged President Obama to avoid the 'catastrophic and irreversible consequences' of climate change", salon.org, November 17, 2016. Re: A 2009 NYT ad supporting the Copenhagen trip. 2014 letter from now-Pres.-elect Trump to Jamie Anderson, POW, for 'your great work on The Apprentice'.

Environmental organizations based in Colorado